The 1968 Valley State Matadors football team represented San Fernando Valley State College—now known as California State University, Northridge—as a member of the California Collegiate Athletic Association (CCAA) during the 1968 NCAA College Division football season. Led by Sam Winningham in his seventh and final season as head coach, Valley State compiled an overall record of 5–4 with a mark of 1–3 in conference play, tying for fourth place in the CCAA. This was the second straight winning season for the Matadors. Valley State played home games at Birmingham High School in Van Nuys, California.

Schedule

References

Valley State
Cal State Northridge Matadors football seasons
Valley State Matadors football